Disney Sports Enterprises may refer to:
 Anaheim Sports, the original Disney Sports Enterprises which owned two professional sports teams in Anaheim
 Walt Disney Parks, Experiences and Consumer Products#Disney Sports Enterprises, formerly called Disney Sports Attractions, which runs ESPN Wide World of Sports Complex and other Disney sports initiatives primarily runDisney